Habib Nasib Nader (born 1979) is a British actor. He is the recipient of a Laurence Olivier Award, having won Best Supporting Actor with a team of six others for operating and voicing the tiger in Life of Pi. They are the first puppeteers to win this award. Nader was in the original cast at the Sheffield Crucible before moving to the Wyndham's Theatre on the West End.

Nader's other theatre credits include The Grouch at the West Yorkshire Playhouse and White Open Spaces in Edinburgh, Soho Theatre and Sweden.

On television, he had a recurring role as Gregory in the BBC comedy Little Britain. He also appeared in the series Judge John Deed, Beehive as well as the film The Golden Compass. He trained at the Academy Drama School and at the London Academy of Music and Dramatic Art.

Filmography

Film

Television

Theatre

Accolades 

 Olivier Awards (2022): Best Supporting Actor, Winner as Voice of Richard Parker/ Cook - Life Of Pi

References

External links

Agent

Living people
1979 births
Alumni of the Academy Drama School
Alumni of the London Academy of Music and Dramatic Art
Black British male actors
British male stage actors
British male television actors
Laurence Olivier Award winners